Luka is a Prague Metro station on Line B. The station was opened on 11 November 1994 as part of the extension of Line B from Nové Butovice to Zličín. It is located on Mukařovského street in the suburb of Stodůlky.

Luka is a surface type station with an island platform and one staircase exit. The name, which literally means Meadows, is shared with the surrounding housing estate.

Gallery

References

External links 

 Gallery and information 

Prague Metro stations
Railway stations opened in 1994
1994 establishments in the Czech Republic
Railway stations in the Czech Republic opened in the 20th century